Myrmecium bifasciatum is an ant-mimicking spider species found in Brazil and French Guiana.

See also 
 List of Corinnidae species

External links 

Corinnidae
Fauna of Brazil
Arthropods of South America
Fauna of French Guiana
Spiders described in 1874
Taxa named by Władysław Taczanowski
Spiders of South America